Eunice Muñoz, OSE, GCIH (30 July 1928 – 15 April 2022) was a Portuguese actress, considered one of the best Portuguese actresses ever. She was born in Amareleja, Portugal. She studied at the Portuguese National Conservatory, nowadays the Lisbon Theatre and Film School (Escola Superior de Teatro e Cinema).

Muñoz was awarded the title of honoris causa by the University of Évora in 2009. She died in Carnaxide on 15 April 2022, at the age of 93.

Selected filmography
 Camões (1946)

 Um Homem do Ribatejo (1946)
 Os Vizinhos do Rés-do-Chão (1947)

 A Morgadinha dos Canaviais (1949)
 Ribatejo (1949)
 Cantiga da Rua (1950)
 O Trigo e o Joio (1965)

 Manhã Submersa (1980)
 A Fachada (1986)
 Repórter X (1987)
 Matar Saudades (1988)

 Hard Times (1988)
 Between the Fingers (2008)

References

External links

1928 births
2022 deaths
People from Moura, Portugal
Portuguese television actresses
Portuguese film actresses
Golden Globes (Portugal) winners
Lisbon Theatre and Film School alumni
Officers of the Order of Saint James of the Sword
Grand Crosses of the Order of Saint James of the Sword
Grand Officers of the Order of Saint James of the Sword
Grand Crosses of the Order of Prince Henry
Grand Officers of the Order of Prince Henry
Grand Crosses of the Order of Merit (Portugal)
20th-century Portuguese actresses
21st-century Portuguese actresses